The Ravana Balaya (Force of Ravana) is a Sinhalese Buddhist nationalist organization in Sri Lanka, which follows the legendary King Ravana. It is led by Ittekande Sandhatissa.

History
The Ravana Balaya gained notoriety for its attacks on Jehova's Witnesses and other Christians. It was believed that then president, Mahinda Rajapaksha on behalf of the SLFP, extended his support to the organisation; additionally received support from the police forces in its campaigns to suppress minority religions.

Organization
The Ravana Balaya is named after the ten headed Rakshasha King Ravana, who in the epic Ramayana is said to have fought against the god Ram and monkey god Hanuman.

The Ravana Balaya along with the Bodu Bala Sena and Sinhala Rawaya are members of the far-right campaign Sinha Le. These organisations have been described as "Fascist" by several academics including DBS Jeyaraj and Dayan Jayatileke. Several human rights organisations have criticized Mahinda Rajapaksha for supporting the groups.

External links
 Ravana Balaya on Facebook

References

Sinhalese nationalist organisations
Anti-Christian sentiment in Asia
Far-right politics in Asia
Buddhist nationalism
Buddhism and violence